Sierra Pro Pilot 98: The Complete Flight Simulator  (also known as simply Pro Pilot) is a 1997 video game developed by  Dynamix and published by Sierra On Line. Two other games in the Pro Pilot series were released in 1998: Pro Pilot USA and Pro Pilot 99.

Reception

The game sold more than 275,000 units.

GameSpot gave the game a score of 6.1 out of 10 stating "With the glaring omissions fixed and a graphics overhaul, Pro Pilot could be contender. As it stands now, it's primarily of interest to potential student pilots looking for a good instrument flying simulator."

See also
Microsoft Flight Simulator 98
Flight Unlimited II

References

1997 video games
General flight simulators
Sierra Entertainment games
Windows games
Windows-only games
Video games developed in the United States